Carpenter High School in Meadow Lake, Saskatchewan is home of the Spartans. Carpenter High School is a grade 9 to 12 school as of the 2019 - 2020 school year.

External links
Carpenter High School

High schools in Saskatchewan
Meadow Lake, Saskatchewan
Educational institutions in Canada with year of establishment missing